Coden is an unincorporated community coastal fishing village in southern Mobile County, Alabama, United States. Located near Bayou la Batre, it lies across the Mississippi Sound from Dauphin Island.

History
The name of the community is derived from Bayou Coden, the bayou that it is situated upon.  Bayou Coden is an English translation of the original French name, Coq d' Inde.  Beginning in the late 1800s the area became known for its resorts, but a hurricane in 1906 ended the hotel business.

Geography

References

Unincorporated communities in Alabama
Unincorporated communities in Mobile County, Alabama
Populated coastal places in Alabama